Taktagulovo (Tuqtağol) is a rural locality (a village) in Kuseyevsky Selsoviet, Baymaksky District, Bashkortostan, Russia. The population was 13 as of 2010. There is 1 street.

Geography 
Taktagulovo is located 78 km north of Baymak (the district's administrative centre) by road. Kuseyevo is the nearest rural locality.

References 

Rural localities in Baymaksky District